Aphelandra sulphurea is a species of plant in the family Acanthaceae. It is endemic to Ecuador.  Its natural habitat is subtropical or tropical moist lowland forests. It is threatened by habitat loss.

References

sulphurea
Endemic flora of Ecuador
Near threatened plants
Taxonomy articles created by Polbot
Taxa named by Joseph Dalton Hooker